The Marietta-class monitors were a pair of ironclad river monitors laid down in the summer of 1862 for the United States Navy during the American Civil War. Construction was slow, partially for lack of labor, and the ships were not completed until December 1865, after the war was over. However the navy did not accept them until 1866 and immediately laid them up. They were sold in 1873 without ever having been commissioned.

Design and description
They were built to gain control of the Mississippi River and its many tributaries.

The original plans for the Marietta-class ships resembled the river monitor  in many ways. The gun turret was at the bow and they had a deckhouse aft. There were also twin smokestacks similar to the Mississippi River steamboat designs. They displaced . The ships had four steam boilers powering two western steamboat-type engines that drove a single propeller.

The ships' main armament consisted of two smoothbore, muzzle-loading  Dahlgren guns mounted in a single gun turret.

Construction
The contract for the two ships was awarded to Tomlinson and Hartupee Co. on 16 May 1862. Construction was at their yard in Pittsburgh, Pennsylvania. Progress was slow, delayed by labor shortages and changes by the navy. The US government allocated $188,000 each for the construction of Marietta and Sandusky, but the final cost rose to $235,039 after charges for extra work.

History
Marietta was laid down in 1862, launched on 4 January 1865 and completed 16 December 1865. "She was accepted by the Navy on 25 April 1866. She was never commissioned. Soon after her acceptance Marietta was laid up at Mound City, Illinois. Renamed Circe on 15 June 1869, the gunboat carried that name only until 10 August, when she was again named Marietta. Remaining at Mound City, Marietta was sold 12 April 1873 to David Campbell" for $16,000.

Sandusky was launched in mid-January 1865; "she was not completed until 26 December 1865, and was accepted by the Navy on 25 April 1866. Never commissioned, she was renamed Minerva on 15 June 1869; but resumed the name Sandusky on 10 August 1869. The monitor was sold at Mound City, Illinois, on 17 April 1873 to David Campbell" for $18,000.

Notes

Footnotes

References 
 
 
 

 

 
Ships built in Pittsburgh
Ships of the Union Navy